Classical Kʼicheʼ was an ancestral form of today's Kʼicheʼ language (Quiché in the older Spanish-based orthography), which was spoken in the highland regions of Guatemala around the time of the 16th-century Spanish conquest of Guatemala. Classical Kʼicheʼ has been preserved in a number of historical Mesoamerican documents, lineage histories, missionary texts, and dictionaries. Most famously, it is the language in which the renowned highland Maya mythological and historical narrative Popol Vuh (or Popol Wuj in modern orthography) is written. Another historical text of partly similar content is the Título de Totonicapán.

Phonology

The details of the phonology of Classical Kʼicheʼ are uncertain, since the Spanish-based writing system expressed it poorly, and one needs to use the most archaic modern dialects to reconstruct the likely pronunciation. A probable phonemic inventory as preserved in archaic Kʼicheʼ dialects is:

Note that most of the glottalised stops are ejectives, but the labial one is implosive instead.

An inherited feature of Kʼicheʼ is phonemic vowel length, but today, some dialects do not preserve it and the orthography of Popol Vuh does not express it either. It is likely that, as in modern Kʼicheʼ dialects, liquids and semivowels were devoiced word-finally and before consonants and that plain stops were aspirated word-finally.

Stress was always on the last syllable of the word.

Orthography

The original Spanish-based orthography was variable and did not distinguish between some phonemes. In this article, the modern Guatemalan standard orthography is used. The following table shows the differences and some similarities between the ways in which Kʼicheʼ phonemes are expressed in these two systems. In other cases, the spelling coincides with the IPA sign.

In addition, as common in the Spanish (and other Latin-based) orthographies of the time, the letter pairs i and j, u and v were treated as equivalent with respect to sound – both members could express either a vowel (/i/, /u/) or a semivowel (/j/, /w/), depending on context.

As indicated in the table, many of the special Kʼicheʼ phonemes, notably the ejectives, did have dedicated signs. These were introduced by Father Francisco de la Parra in the middle of the 16th century and were based on inverted numbers: ɛ (inverted 3) for /qʼ/, g (actually an inverted 4) for /kʼ/, g, (inverted 4 with a comma) for /tsʼ/ and gh (inverted 4 with an h) for /tʃʼ/. There was also a sign for /tʼ/, which may be rendered as ɧ, and /q/ could be expressed with k. However, the signs were used inconsistently or not at all in many manuscripts, and Father Francisco Ximénez, who was responsible for the writing down of the Popol Vuj, apparently failed to realise that they expressed special sounds in Kʼicheʼ.

Some common phonological alternations result from the coalescence of adjacent vowels (chi- + -u > ch-u, V- + -on > -V-n) and the elision of word-final consonants of particles and function words phrase-internally (but not finally): (chik > chi). The vowels of certain suffixes become completely identical to the vowel of the root; some of these suffixes are affected in this way by any root vowel, but others, containing /o/, are influenced only by a preceding /u/ in the root, and others also by a preceding /a/.

Grammar

The grammar of Classical Kʼicheʼ is fairly similar in most respects to that of the majority of modern Kʼicheʼ dialects. Some notable differences are the existence of special future tense prefixes, the default VSO word order and the preservation of indigenous rather than borrowed Spanish forms for the higher numerals.

Nominal morphology 

Nouns have only the categories number, possession and alienability.

Number

The plural is marked only on nouns that designate persons, and even among them only some have the ability to take it. The suffix is -Vbʼ, with the vowel being lexically determined and unpredictable, although it is most commonly /a/ (e.g. ajaw-abʼ 'princes').

Possession

Possession is expressed by the following prefixes:

Some examples are u-bʼe 'his way', r-ochoch 'his house', a-chuch 'your (sg.) mother', nu-wach 'my face', qa-bʼiʼ 'our name'.

The standard way of marking possession of a noun by another noun is by juxtaposing the possessed noun, marked with a 3rd person possessive prefix, and the possessor noun: u-kʼuʼx kaj 'the heart of heaven', lit. 'its heart, heaven'. This is a head-marking construction typical of the  Mesoamerican linguistic area.

The marking of possession is incompatible with the marking of number; in other words, the possessive prefixes and the plural suffix may not co-occur.

Alienability

Nouns may be inalienable or alienable. Inalienable nouns must always have a prefix expressing their possessor. They are mostly designations of parts of the body and relatives, certain other possessions such as the house (-ochoch), as well as nouns expressing spatial relations ('top' as in 'on top of' etc.). Alienable nouns do not require a possessive prefix, and some of them (such as designations of wild animals and plants, natural phenomena) normally don't have one.

To transform an inalienable noun into an alienable one, the suffix -Vxel is added to names of relatives, and the suffix -aj is added to names of body parts: gajol-axel 'sons'. Conversely, a noun that normally has no possessor can be transformed into an inalienable one by means of the suffix -Vl, which may also serve to emphasise the possession as in 'one's own N': u-chikop-il 'its animal(s)'.

Relational nouns

Certain inalienable nouns express spatial or abstract relations and thus function like prepositions: e.g. xeʼ 'root' – u-xeʼ N 'under N' (lit. 'its-root N'). Some others are more similar to adverbial modifiers. These are listed below:

Adjectives

Adjectives are normally indeclinable. However, certain adjectives have a special attributive form that ends in the suffix -V (nim-a cheʼ 'a big tree', in contrast to nim ri cheʼ 'the tree is big') and appears only before consonant-initial words (cf. nim aq 'a big pecari'). A few can also take a special plural suffix -aq: nim-aq juyubʼ 'the big mountains'. Adjectives can also be used adverbially: nim x-kikot 'he rejoiced greatly'.

Pronouns

Personal pronouns

The free forms of the pronouns can be used only when in focus and are as follows:

Note: are is actually a demonstrative used instead of a personal pronoun.
The polite pronoun is unique in that it has no corresponding possessive prefix; instead, the free form is just placed after the possessed noun: alibʼ la 'your daughter-in-law'.

Otherwise, pronominal possession is expressed by the prefixes listed in the subsection Possession of the section on nouns.

Demonstrative pronouns

Demonstratives express not only distance, but also visibility. The following demonstratives are used:

Adverbially, waral 'here' may be used. Other demonstrative adverbs are keje 'so' and ta, kʼate and kʼut, all three of which can be glossed as (and) then. The 'definite article' is not obligatory.

Interrogrative pronouns

The interrogative pronouns are naki 'what' and a(pa)chinaq 'who'. Other question words are a pa 'where' and jupacha 'how'.

Verbal morphology

The basic scheme of the verb chain is as follows:

The 'status suffix', also known as a 'modal suffix', expresses simultaneously three different grammatical distinctions: the contrast between indicative and imperative/optative mood (the latter having also a supine-like usage), the valency of the verb (whether it is intransitive or transitive) and whether the verb is phrase-final or not.

Tense and aspect morphemes

The tense-aspect prefixes are as follows:

The vowels in parentheses appear only if the next morpheme begins in a consonant. The future form is not found in contemporary Kʼicheʼ.

Personal agreement morphemes

The personal agreement prefixes are as follows:

The vowels in parentheses appear only if the next morpheme begins in a consonant, and the consonants in parentheses appear only if the next morpheme begins in a vowel. Some other final consonants may occasionally disappear in front of consonant-initial morphemes, too; e.g. in- occasionally appears as i-. Note that the absolutive prefixes are identical with the independent forms of the personal pronouns, and the ergative prefixes are identical with the nominal possessive prefixes meaning 'my', 'your' etc.

Status morphemes

The status suffixes are:

Besides the absolute final position, the final forms may are also commonly used in front of complex or coordinated noun phrases, as well as in cases when a demonstrative pronoun referring to the noun phrase is placed in the beginning of the clause, or when an adverbial modifier not referenced with the particle wi is.

Summary and examples of finite verb forms

Altogether, the possible affixes in the chain are:

Some examples are:

 xk-e-ul-ik 'they will come'
 xch-u-rayi-j 'he will desire it'
 k-ix-qa-sach 'we destroy you (pl.)'
 x-e-qa-chʼak-o 'we defeated them'
 k-at-tzijon-oq 'speak!'
 w-il-a 'I want to see it!'
 m-i-yaʼ 'Don't give it!'

Non-finite verb forms

Participles

The following participle suffixes exist:

In spite of their norminal nature, the participles are used predicatively, like verbs, more often than attributively or adverbially.

Infinitive

The infinitive suffixes are the following:

The infinitive functions as a verbal noun and if it has a possessor, the latter may correspond not only to a transitive, but also to the intransitive subject. The two transitive infinitives appear to correspond to the unmarked and antipassive voices; the former always appears with an object, whereas the latter need not do so.

Summary of relations between finite and non-finite endings

Voice

There are as many as two kinds of antipassive verb forms, which cause the subject of a transitive verb to be in the absolutive case rather than the normal ergative – the absolute antipassive, which allows the omission the object (x-∅-kʼat-on ri k-atiʼt 'their grandmother burnt [something]'), and the focus antipassive, which is used to emphasise the subject (xa ajkun x-∅-kʼam-ow-ik ri kʼuwal 'but the doctor took the jewel'). The two are distinguished only in class 1 transitive verbs. There are also passives, which are used to omit the ergative subject – besides the basic one there is also a completive passive that emphasises the completion of an action and the resulting state of its object. Their suffixes are the following:

In the focus antipassive, absolutive agreement with the direct object may be preserved if the subject is the unmarked third person singular: mana ixoq x-e-alan-ik 'no woman bore them'.
Since the resulting forms are intransitive, they receive the status suffixes of intransitives (-ik and so on).	The stem-forming suffix -Vlaʼ- also seems to be replaced by -Vlo- before -n. The applicative construction with the suffix -ibʼe-j can also be described as an 'instrumental voice' changing the valency of the verb so as to make an instrumental adverbial modifer into a direct (absolutive) object: xa chʼut x-ki-kejbʼe-j r-ij ki-tinamit 'only with stakes did they fortify the outer side (lit. back) of their city.'

Examples:

 x-bʼan-ow(-ik) 'he is the one who made it' (focus antipassive)
 x-bʼan-on(-ik) 'he made (something)' (absolutive antipassive)
 x-e-tzono-n(-ik) 'they asked (for something)' (absolutive antipassive)
 x-bʼan(-ik) (/x-bʼaːn-ik/?) 'it was made' (passive)
 x-e-tzono-x(-ik) 'they were asked' (passive)
 x-bʼan-ataj(-ik) 'it was made completely' (completive passive)

Verb complexes

Pairs of verbs can be combined to form verbal complexes, where the second verb can usually be interpreted as subordinated to the first. Only the first verb receives the tense-aspect prefix and only the second one receives a status suffix: k-e-raj aqʼan-ik 'they want to go up'. The first verb gets the absolutive agreement prefixes as in the example above, but the second verb gets the ergative ones if it is transitive: x-∅-kʼis k-il-o 'they stopped seeing it'.

The second verb usually has the indicative status suffix, but it has the imperative one in combinations where the first verb is one of the motion verbs bʼe 'go' and ul 'come' (e.g. x-e-bʼe kam-oq 'they went to die') and, optionally, when the second verb is a motion verb expressing direction such as uloq 'come', aqʼanoq 'rise', ubʼik 'move away from here', qajoq 'descend', apanoq 'arrive there (out) in the vicinity', kanoq 'stay, remain': e.g. x-el ul-oq 'he went hither'. In the latter case, the second verb can also be viewed as a directional adverbial particle.

Particles

Kʼicheʼ uses numerous particles, many of which carry modal meaning and are often difficult to translate. Particles tend to be encliticised to the first stressed phrase in the sentence, which is the verb in the default case, but may also be any fronted phrase (cf. Wackernagel's law in the Indo-European languages). Some, however, can also be sentence-initial and receive enclitics themselves, sometimes forming long particle chains. Some common particles are the following:

If several of the above enclitics are combined, the order is ta(j) > chic > wi, na > others.

A particle serving as a conjunction is we 'if'.

Prepositions

A nearly all-purpose preposition is chi 'at, in, to' (cf. the relational noun chiʼ 'side'), which can introduce various relational nouns, especially with locative meaning: ch-u-wach ri Tojil 'in front of Tojil' (lit. 'at Tojil's face'). In addition, pa is used with the meaning 'inside (something)' (cf. the relational noun pa(m) with the same meaning). Besides combinations of the prepositions with relational nouns, it is often the verb itself that determines the specific spatial relation expressed by the preposition: e.g. opon means 'come (to a place)', whereas pe(t) means 'come (from a place)'. Hence x-Ø-opon chi Tulan 'he came to Tulan', but x-Ø-pe chi Tulan 'he came from Tulan'.

Word formation

The boundaries between inflection and derivation aren't clearcut; thus, the passives and antipassives, as well as the participle and infinitive may also be regarded as derivations. Just like inflection, derivation often crucially distinguishes between intransitive and transitive verbs of class 1 and 2 as bases, with special treatment reserved for roots that express position (so-called positional roots).

Intransitive verb formation

The following suffixes form intransitive verbs:

In addition, the suffix -Vn seems to form intransitive verbs from nouns and adjectives,  meaning 'become/be X': e.g. utz-ij 'become good'. However, it is unclear whether this suffix is distinct from the antipassve suffix.

Transitive verb formation

The following suffixes form transitive verbs:

Note that the /a/ in -Vlaʼ and -VKaʼ is often replaced by /o/ in various formations, including the passive.

Noun formation

The following suffixes form nouns:

Nouns may also be formed by compounding, in which case the right member functions as a head: kʼicheʼ tzij 'Kʼicheʼ language', bʼalam jolom 'jaguar head'. As with adjectives, a connecting vowel of unpredictable quality (but most commonly /a/) may appear between two consonants: tzʼikin-a ja 'jaguar house'

Another common way of forming designations of persons, especially agent nouns, is by prefixation with aj-: aj-tzʼibʼ 'writer'.

Numerals

The numerals have free forms, which are used as separate words, and bound forms, which are used to form compounds. The free forms of 2 to 9 contain the plural suffix -Vb: e.g. kaʼ-ibʼ 'two', wuq-ubʼ 'seven'; in noun phrases: ox-ibʼ bʼe 'three roads', ox-ibʼ kajol-abʼ 'three boys'. Their bound forms lack that suffix: kaʼ, wuq- etc. The numerals 1 jun and 10 lajuj lose their final consonants in bound form: ju-, laju-.

The teens are formed by adding the bound forms of the units to the word lajuj 'ten': ju-lajuj 'eleven', wuq-lajuj 'seven-teen'. The higher numbers are based on a vigesimal principle, with multiples of 20 (-winaq, lit. 'man', with ten fingers and ten toes), 400 and 8000 (-chui); thus 24.000 is ox-chuwi (3 X 8000). However, other multiples of twenty but 20 and 40 actually have their own roots, e.g. much '80', and 400 is exceptionally expressed as 5 X 80 o-much rather than *20 X 20. Numerals close to powers of twenty are expressed in a way that can be exemplified as follows: 381 = lit. '1 on 400', 390 = lit. '10 on 400', etc.

The bound forms are also used in combinations with numeral classifiers, which are required with certain nouns: ox-chobʼ tinamit 'three cities'.

Ordinals are expressed by prefixing the cardinal with the 3rd singular possessive prefix" 'r-ox' 'its three (N) = three (of N) = the third (N)'. Only the ordinal 'first' is suppletive: nabʼeʼ.
Distributive numerals can be formed by reduplication of the first syllable (ka-kabʼ  'two by two') or by postposing the morpheme taq 'a quantity, number': bʼelejebʼ taq 'nine each'.

The following suffixes can be added to numerals:
 -ichal expresses 'a group of (X number'); e.g. kaj-ichal 'a group of four'.
 -mul expresses 'X number of times', e.g. kaj-mul 'four times'
 -ix and -ij expresses time in the future, i.e. 'in X days, on the Xth day': e.g. kabʼ-ij 'in two days'
 -ir added to -ij expresses time in the past, i.e. 'X days ago': e.g. kabʼ-ij-ir 'two days ago'

Syntax

The default word order is VSO (with predicative adjectives also taking the place of the verb). This is different from most modern dialects, where much vacillation is found, but the most archaic ones seem to have VOS. It should also be noted that it is relatively uncommon for one and the same sentence to contain expressions of both the subject and the object by separate words. In spite of the default status of VSO, different phrases can be fronted to the place before the verb to express focus and emphasis; this fronting is obligatory for question words and independent forms of the pronouns. A transitive subject, however, can only be fronted if the verb is in the antipassive voice. If the fronted phrase is an adverbial modifier (most commonly a locational one), the verb may be followed by the particle wi. Particles are placed after the first phrase in the word (the verb or a fronted phrase).

Existence is expressed with the verb kʼo(jeʼ) 'there is', and 'having' is expressed with that verb and possessive prefixes on the noun: kʼo u-xikʼ 'it has wings', lit. 'wings of it exist'. The verb of existence is suppletively negated with another root, jabʼi, i.e. as ma jabʼi.

Both adjectives and possessors precede their nouns. Of demonstratives, the definite article ri also precedes the noun, as does the 3rd person plural pronoun e used for emphasis, but other demonstratives follow it. The possessor of a deverbal noun is always the subject.

Sample text (beginning of the Popol Vuh)

References

   
Einführung in das kolonialzeitliche Kʼicheʼ (Quiché) by Michael Dürr - an introduction to Classical Kʼicheʼ, in German
Morphologie, Syntax und Textstrukturen des Maya-Quiche des Popol Vuh by Michael Dürr - a description of the grammar of the Classical Kʼicheʼ of Popol Vuh, in German (archived copy at the Internet Archive)
 

Classical languages
Mayan languages
Classical Mesoamerican languages
Indigenous languages of Central America